Parsian (also Romanized as Pārsiān; is a city and capital of Parsian County, Hormozgan Province, Iran. At the 2016 census, its population was 18,045.

Language 
The linguistic composition of the city:

References 

Populated places in Parsian County
Cities in Hormozgan Province